Medley Godfrey Siddall (January 20, 1875 – August 31, 1964) was a Canadian politician. He served in the Legislative Assembly of New Brunswick as member of the Progressive Conservative party representing Westmorland County from 1925 to 1935.

References

1875 births
1964 deaths
Progressive Conservative Party of New Brunswick MLAs